Progress in Physics is an open-access academic journal, publishing papers in theoretical and experimental physics, including related themes from mathematics. The journal was founded by Dmitri Rabounski, Florentin Smarandache, and Larissa Borissova in 2005, and is published quarterly. Rabounski is the editor-in-chief, while Smarandache and Borissova act as associate editors.

Aims and reviewing process 
The journal aims to promote fair and non-commercialized science, as stated in its Declaration of Academic Freedom:
Owing to furtive jealousy and vested interest, modern science abhors open discussion and willfully banishes those scientists who question the orthodox views. Very often, scientists of outstanding ability, who point out deficiencies in current theory or interpretation of data, are labelled as crackpots, so that their views can be conveniently ignored.

The journal describes itself as peer-reviewed. The review procedure is specified as follows:
The journal promotes individual academic freedom and will consider all work without regard to affiliations. For this reason, the articles published in Progress in Physics may not necessarily represent the scientific views of the Editorial Board or its individual members. All submissions will be forwarded to invited experts, whose professional field is close to the submission. Decision about the submission will be produced by the Editors, according to the recommendations obtained from the side of the reviewers.

The referees of the papers published are not listed, although anonymity of referees is specifically criticized in "Article 8: Freedom to publish scientific results" of the Declaration of Academic Freedom. This document harshly criticizes the current peer-review system using the words "censorship", "alleged expert referees", "blacklisting", and "bribes". The journal has published papers by several authors, who, along with some of the editors, claim to have been blacklisted by the Cornell University arXiv as proponents of fringe scientific theories.

Indexing and abstracting
The journal is or has been indexed and abstracted in the following bibliographic databases:

It is mentioned in the list of open-access journals maintained by DOAJ, and was indexed in the (paywalled) aggregator Open J-Gate and in the website Scientific Commons.

References and notes

External links
 Progress in Physics website
 

Physics journals
Open access journals
Fringe science journals
Publications established in 2005
Pseudoscience
Quarterly journals